Tatypur railway station (Urdu and ) is located in Tatipur village, Multan district of Punjab province, Pakistan.

See also
located at centre of Khanewal & Multan
 List of railway stations in Pakistan
 Pakistan Railways

References

External links

Railway stations in Multan District
Defunct railway stations in Pakistan
Railway stations on Karachi–Peshawar Line (ML 1)